Let the River Flow with Darrell Evans is a live Christian worship music album by Darrell Evans released by Hosanna! Music in 1997.

Track listing 
"New Song Arisin'" (Darrell Evans) - 4:01
"My God Reigns" (Evans) - 4:47
"We Will Embrace Your Move" (Evans) - 7:00
"Let the River Flow" (Evans) - 6:28
"You Are I Am" (Evans) - 4:54
"Refuge" (Evans) - 6:28
"The Kingdom Song" (Evans) - 5:24
"Favorite Friend" (Evans) - 5:10
"I Surrender" (Evans and Scott Griffith) - 6:46
"I Am Yours" (Evans) - 5:33
"How Deeply I Need You" (Evans) - 4:58
"The Spirit of Revival" (Evans) - 6:10

Credits 
Producers:
 Paul Mills
 Lisa Terrell

Executive Producers:
 Chris Long
 Don Moen

A&R Director
 Chris Springer A&R, A&R assistance

Worship Leader: 
 Darrell Evans

Musicians:
 Scott Griffith – keyboards
 Paul Mills – keyboards
 Darrell Evans – acoustic guitar
 Todd Davidson – electric guitar
 David Massey – electric guitar
 Jerry McPherson – mandolin,  additional guitars
 Matt Jones – bass 
 Scott French – drums
 James Giancola – drums
 Gyle Smith – drums
 Matt Steele – percussion

Background Vocals:
 Preston Bostwick
 Gayla Evans
 Heidi French
 Denise Johnson
 Chris Rodriguez
 Nicol Smith
 Jennifer George – female solo on "Refuge"

Engineers:
 Paul Mills – engineer, mixing 
 Matt Damico – assistant engineer
 Glenn "Zippy" Montjoy – assistant engineer, editing, mastering
 Jeff Pitzer – assistant engineer
 Recorded "Live" at Open Bible Fellowship, Tulsa, OK.

Darrell Evans (musician) albums
1997 live albums